Tesfai Ghirmazion was the first Minister of Agriculture of Eritrea and moved in 1997 to the Ministry of Land, Water, and Environment as its first Minister.

References

People's Front for Democracy and Justice politicians
Government ministers of Eritrea
Living people
Year of birth missing (living people)